Kai Steffen (born 19 September 1961 in Hamburg) is a former German professional football player.

Steffen played in youth team of Hamburger SV. In 1979, he went to California Surf and played for two years in the NASL. 1981 he returned to Germany and in 1984 he got a contract for the professional team of Hamburger SV. In 1986, he made and played in the Olympics for the German national team, and played again in 1990. But after three years in the German Bundesliga, he made only seven Matches. He started again a career in the United States and played for Los Angeles Lazers.

External links
 http://sport-dienst.fussball.de/fussballspieler/steffenkai/1985/ Infos (german)

References

1961 births
Living people
Bundesliga players
German footballers
Hamburger SV players
North American Soccer League (1968–1984) players
California Surf players
German footballers needing infoboxes
Association football midfielders
Footballers from Hamburg